The Gießen–Gelnhausen railway (also known as the Lahn-Kinzig Railway) is a single-track, non-electrified mainline in the German state of Hesse. It runs from Gießen via Nidda to Gelnhausen.

Operations
The line is part of the government-owned railway network (DB Netz) and is currently  (2012) served by passenger trains (GTW 2/6) operated by the HLB Hessenbahn GmbH, a subsidiary of Hessische Landesbahn, on behalf of the Rhein-Main-Verkehrsverbund (Rhine-Main Transport Association, RMV).

In the 2003/2004 timetable, which commenced on 14 December 2003, services on weekends and holidays was reordered. In addition, the Nidda–Glauburg–Büdingen–Gelnhausen section is served every morning and evening by bus line 374. Until the 2009/2010 timetable, this route was still called line 610 and served the whole line from Gelnhausen to Gießen.

History
Planning on the line began in 1862 and it was built and operated by the Upper Hessian Railway Company (Oberhessische Eisenbahn-Gesellschaft) and opened in several sections:

An extension to Partenstein on the Bavarian Ludwig's Western Railway (Ludwigs-West-Bahn) did not come about. However, the line became important from 1888 with the integration of some branch lines in the Vogelsberg and Wetterau.

The Upper Hessian Railway Company was nationalised in 1876 and its operations were taken over by the Grand Duchy of Hesse State Railways (Großherzoglich Hessische Staatseisenbahnen).

Notes

References

 
 
  
 

Railway lines in Hesse
Railway lines opened in 1869
1869 establishments in the Grand Duchy of Hesse
Middle Hesse
Giessen
Buildings and structures in Giessen (district)
Buildings and structures in Wetteraukreis
Buildings and structures in Main-Kinzig-Kreis